The High Country Cycle Challenge is a non competitive ride held near , Victoria, Australia.

The 2007 event consisted of a three-stage  challenge including the ascent of Mount Buller.

The Scody High Country Challenge is a single day, non competitive road cycling event. The rides all originate in Mansfield.

See also

Cycling in Victoria

References 

Cycling in Victoria (Australia)
Cycling events in Victoria